Bruno Stagnaro (born June 15, 1973) is an Argentine film and television director, producer and screenwriter. He works mainly in the cinema of Argentina. He has also acted professionally a few times. He is the son of renowned filmmaker Juan Bautista Stagnaro.

Filmography

Film 
 Guarisove, los olvidados (1995)
 Pizza, birra, faso (1998) aka Pizza, Beer, and Cigarettes (co-directed)
 Historias de Argentina en vivo (2001)

Television
 Okupas (2000)
 Vientos de agua (2006)
 Un gallo para Esculapio (2017)
 El Eternauta (TBA)

Awards
Wins
 Fribourg International Film Festival: FIPRESCI Prize; Israel Adrián Caetano and Bruno Stagnaro, for a first feature by two young directors who dramatise with force and without sentimentality the predicament of the teenage marginals of Argentina; and Grand Prix, for Pizza, birra, faso; 1998.
 Gramado Film Festival: Golden Kikito; Best Director, Best Film, Best Screenplay, for Pizza, birra, faso; 1998.  Shared with Israel Adrián Caetano.
 Toulouse Latin America Film Festival: Grand Prix; for Pizza, birra, faso; 1998. Shared with Israel Adrián Caetano.
 Argentine Film Critics Association Awards: Silver Condor; Best First Film, for Pizza, birra, faso; 1999.

References

External links
 
 

1973 births
Argentine film directors
Argentine film producers
Argentine screenwriters
Male screenwriters
Argentine male writers
Living people
Place of birth missing (living people)